Mark Kenneth Mercer (born May 22, 1954) is an American former professional baseball pitcher from Fort Bragg, North Carolina. He appeared in seven games in Major League Baseball for the 1981 Texas Rangers.

Mercer was drafted by the Pittsburgh Pirates in the 1st round of the secondary phase of the 1973 amateur draft out of Hill College. He was released by the Pirates during spring training in 1976. He left professional baseball for two full seasons before signing with the Rangers prior to the 1978 season.

Notes

External links 

Hill College Rebels baseball players
Major League Baseball pitchers
Texas Rangers players
Gulf Coast Pirates players
Niagara Falls Pirates players
Charleston Pirates players
Asheville Tourists players
Tulsa Drillers players
Charleston Charlies players
Wichita Aeros players
Denver Bears players
Oklahoma City 89ers players
Baseball players from North Carolina
1954 births
Living people
People from Fort Bragg, North Carolina